Carlo Simonetti (born 23 May 1903, date of death unknown) was an Italian modern pentathlete. He competed at the 1928 and 1932 Summer Olympics.

References

External links
 

1903 births
Year of death missing
Italian male modern pentathletes
Olympic modern pentathletes of Italy
Modern pentathletes at the 1928 Summer Olympics
Modern pentathletes at the 1932 Summer Olympics
Sportspeople from the Province of Arezzo